Heaton railway station was a railway station in Newcastle upon Tyne, England, near the southern boundary of Heaton with Byker. The station was built in the nineteenth century and closed on 11 August 1980.

History
In 1839 the Newcastle and Shields railway was opened and this line later became the direct line to the coast from Newcastle upon Tyne, although at that time the line terminated in Carliol Square and not at Newcastle Central station. This predecessor of the North Eastern Railway company (NER) shared those two tracks up to Heaton Junction and "on the 1st July 1847 Newcastle was connected by rail with Berwick, and thus placed on the main line between Edinburgh and London." The railway line and station at Heaton were built in a cutting.

First station
The first station stood in a cutting on the double track shared by the main line to Edinburgh and the Newcastle & North Shields route. The principal building stood on the down (NW) platform, facing a smaller building on the up platform. When it opened the station stood in a rural location, the nearest village being Byker Hill, about ¼ mile to the east, but during the later decades of the 19th century the terraces of the residential suburb of Heaton began to fill the fields on both sides of the railway. In 1887 the line from Newcastle Central station to Heaton Junction was widened from two tracks to four tracks. The original station was demolished and a new station built further to the west of Heaton Road.

Second station
In 1887 the line from Newcastle Central Station to Heaton Junction was widened from two tracks to four tracks. The two tracks to the north were for mainline services to Edinburgh and the two southern tracks for the direct services from Newcastle Central Station to the coast. These two southern tracks were electrified in 1904.

The station was used principally for services on the direct line from Newcastle Central station to the coast but with some local services such as the line to Morpeth on the main line and some mainline services on the line from Newcastle to Edinburgh Waverley.

Tyne & Wear Metro
The Tyne & Wear Metro did not use that section of line which included Heaton railway station and the station became redundant when the Metro was built.

East Coast Main Line
When the East Coast Main Line (ECML) was electrified the opportunity was taken to rationalise the track work in many places including the section from Newcastle Central Station to the carriage sidings at Heaton. The station platforms at Heaton were demolished and the previous four tracks were replaced with three tracks, each signalled for running in either direction. The electrification was completed in 1990. Owing to the positioning of the bridge piers for the road bridge over the line the southernmost track still follows the alignment around the now non-existent platform.

See also
East Coast Main Line
Newcastle and North Shields Railway
North Eastern Railway
Tyne and Wear Metro
Tyneside Electrics

References

Disused railway stations in Tyne and Wear
Buildings and structures in Newcastle upon Tyne
Transport in Newcastle upon Tyne
Railway stations in Great Britain opened in 1856
Railway stations in Great Britain closed in 1887
Railway stations in Great Britain opened in 1887
Railway stations in Great Britain closed in 1980
Former North Eastern Railway (UK) stations